The burrhead shiner (Notropis asperifrons) is a species of cyprinid fish. It is endemic to the United States and occurs in the Alabama and Black Warrior River systems in southeastern Tennessee, northwestern Georgia, and Alabama, mostly above the Fall Line. It grows to  total length. It can be locally common and occurs in rocky and sandy pools and runs of clear creeks and small rivers, usually on or near bottom.  It is state threatened in Georgia, however.

References

Notropis
Freshwater fish of the United States
Endemic fauna of the United States
Fish described in 1955